Bobing may refer to:

 Böbing, a municipality in Bavaria, Germany
 Bo Bing (game), a Chinese dice game
 Popiah, also known as bobing